"I Ain't Worried" is a song by American pop rock band OneRepublic, released on May 13, 2022, through Mosley Music Group and Interscope Records. It is the second and final single to the soundtrack for the film Top Gun: Maverick (2022). The song was written and produced by Ryan Tedder, Brent Kutzle, and Tyler Spry, with production from Simon Oscroft and John Nathaniel. The song also contains elements of Peter Bjorn and John's 2006 hit single "Young Folks" and features background vocals from Tedder's son; Copeland Tedder. OneRepublic was the only band to present an original song for the film.

The track debuted on the UK Singles Chart on June 3 and on the Irish Singles Chart on June 10, climbing positions until it peaked in the UK top three and the Ireland top five. It became the band's biggest hit in the UK since "Love Runs Out" (2014). "I Ain't Worried" debuted at number 76 on the US Billboard Hot 100 and peaked at number 6, becoming their fourth top ten hit there. While on the Canadian Hot 100 the song debuted at number 41 and peaked at number 3. "I Ain't Worried" also peaked at number 1 in Belgium, Hungary, Iceland and New Zealand, and reached the top ten in other countries, including Australia, Austria, Brazil, Bulgaria, Czech Republic, France, Greece, Japan, Lebanon, Lithuania, Malaysia, Malta, Netherlands, Poland, Russia, Singapore, Slovakia, South Africa, South Korea, Switzerland and Taiwan.

Upon release, "I Ain't Worried" received highly positive reviews from music critics, being praised for its sunny production and upbeat melody.

Background and music
In an interview with Ryan Seacrest on On Air with Ryan Seacrest, Tedder revealed that the idea for the song started during the beginning of the COVID-19 pandemic, after one of his friends at Paramount Pictures invited him to participate in the soundtrack of the new Top Gun. At that time, Tom Cruise had turned down about thirty songs for the soundtrack, and was looking for a band to create an original song for the new film, specifically for the beach scene. Tedder said that "I Ain't Worried" was "written with the characters in mind relaxing and having fun in the scene for the first time in those two hours of film", making the song manage to make the scene memorable in its own way and at the same time fit in with the action and emotion scenes throughout the film. The band recorded the song during the 2021 MTV Europe Music Awards in November at the Kempinski Hotel Corvinus in Budapest, where they stayed during the song's release on May 13. The song also featured the band's frontman Ryan Tedder's son Copeland, who was credited as one of the backing vocals. Following the release of the lead single from the Top Gun: Maverick soundtrack on May 3, "I Ain't Worried" was officially released as the second single on May 13 by Interscope Records and Mosley Music Group, the label on which the band is part. The song, along with its music video directed by Isaac Rentz, made its global debut on MTV Live and MTVU, as well as on the billboards of the Paramount Theater Manhattan on Times Square.

"I Ain't Worried" appears during the scene where Maverick and his students play football at a beach.

Critical reception

"I Ain't Worried" attracted widespread praise by music critics. Greta Brereton of NME praised Tedder's vocals on the song, also highlighting the song's fast-paced melody and upbeat pop production, in contrast to Lady Gaga's song for the soundtrack, "Hold My Hand". In a Billboard article, Hannah Dailey praised the song's lyrical content and laid-back style, citing that they "uniquely connect with the atmosphere of the movie scene in which the song makes its presence". Writing for The Charlotte Observer, Théoden James said the beat and vocals of song is a "super-infectious bubblegum" and a "pop perfection in general".

Tyler Golsen from Far Out Magazine wrote that I Ain’t Worried' doesn’t have enough length or substance to be considered annoying. It’s just a brief slice of pop music nothingness: sunny, breezy, light, and utterly forgettable", but praised the song's melody, saying "Granted, something scratches at the back of your ears when you put the song. Chalk that up to super technician Ryan Tedder, who can make a memorable melody out of just about anything".

Music video
The accompanying music video was directed by Isaac Rentz, best known for directing the music videos of "She's Kinda Hot" by 5 Seconds of Summer and "Hey Hey Hey" by Katy Perry. The music video was released on May 13, 2022 alongside the song, and was shown in major theaters across the United States. The band performs on the palm tree-covered outdoor stage under the sunset, with the images interspersed with a few clips from the film every now and then.

Live performances
To promote the film and song with the release of its soundtrack, OneRepublic performed "I Ain't Worried" for the first time on May 28, 2022, on The Tonight Show Starring Jimmy Fallon. The band performed the song for the second time on Good Morning America (GMA) held on July 15, 2022 at Times Square Studios in Manhattan. The song was also a regular part of band setlist for the Never Ending Summer Tour. After the tour, on October 5, 2022, the band performed the song once again during The Late Late Show with James Corden. On November 13, 2022, the band performed "I Ain't Worried" at the 2022 MTV Europe Music Awards.

Personnel
 Ryan Tedder – vocals, songwriter, production, vocal production
 Tyler Spry – songwriter, production, guitar, background vocals
 Brent Kutzle – songwriter, production
 Simon Oscroft – production, guitar
 John Nathaniel – co-production, mixing, background vocals
 John Eriksson – songwriter
 Peter Morén – songwriter
 Björn Yttling – songwriter
 Chris Gehringer – mastering
 Brandon Collins – additional programming
 Copeland Tedder – main background vocals

Charts

Weekly charts

Monthly charts

Year-end charts

Certifications

Release history

References

2022 singles
2022 songs
Interscope Records singles
Mosley Music Group singles
Number-one singles in Iceland
Number-one singles in New Zealand
OneRepublic songs
Songs from Top Gun
Songs written by Ryan Tedder
Songs written by Brent Kutzle
Songs written by Björn Yttling
Song recordings produced by Ryan Tedder
Songs written for films
Ultratop 50 Singles (Wallonia) number-one singles